In the Book of Numbers, Ammishaddai ( ‘Ammīšadāy "people of the Almighty") was the father of Ahiezer, who was chief of the Tribe of Dan at the time of the Exodus (Numbers 1:12; 2:25).

This is one of the few names compounded with the name of God, Shaddai.

Notes

Book of Numbers people
Tribe of Dan